William Lon Johnson (November 11, 1882 – July 5, 1967)  was a Republican politician from the U.S. state of Washington. Johnson was elected to the Washington State Senate from Stevens and Pend Oreille Counties, 1919–1924. He served as the ninth Lieutenant Governor of Washington for one term, and then was elected Superior Court Judge.

References

Sources
 

Lieutenant Governors of Washington (state)
1882 births
1967 deaths
20th-century American politicians
People from Colville, Washington